Crossroads is the soundtrack to the 1986 film starring Ralph Macchio, Joe Seneca and Jami Gertz, inspired by the legend of blues musician Robert Johnson.

The film was written by John Fusco and directed by Walter Hill and featured an original score by Ry Cooder. Guitarists William Kanengiser, Arlen Roth and Steve Vai perform in the film but are not featured in the soundtrack.

Track listing

Personnel
Ry Cooder - Guitar, mandolin, vocals
Otis Taylor - Guitar
Frank Frost - Harmonica, vocals
Sonny Terry - Harmonica
John "Juke" Logan - Harmonica
Jim Keltner - Drums
John Price - Drums
Jim Dickinson - Piano, dolceola
Van Dyke Parks - Piano
Alan Pasqua - Synthesizer
Nathan East - Bass
Jorge Calderón - Bass
Richard "Shubby" Holmes - Bass
Miguel Cruz - Percussion
George Bohanon - Baritone sax
Walt Sereth - Soprano sax
Amy Madigan - Vocals
Bobby King, Terry Evans, Willie Green Jr - Backing vocals

Charts

References 

Musical film soundtracks
1986 soundtrack albums